Sportvereniging Coronie Boys  is an association football club from Totness, Suriname. Having spent spells in both the Hoofdklasse and Eerste Klasse, the club currently compete in the lower divisions of Surinamese football.

History
S.V. Coronie Boys were the first club from the Coronie District to compete in the SVB Hoofdklasse, breaking ground at the top flight in 1957. The team won the Randdistrictentoernooi in 1989, and won the Interdistrictentoernooi the following year. In the 1994–95 season Coronie Boys finished as the league runner-up to S.V. Robinhood. They also finished as runner's up in the Suriname President's Cup to Robinhood that same year, The team currently play their home games at the Letitia Vriesde Sportcomplex on the Totness polder to a capacity of 1,000 people.

Achievements
Hoofdklasse: 1
Runners-up: 1994–95

Suriname President's Cup: 1
Runners-up: 1995

Interdistrictentoernooi: 1
Winners: 1990

Randdistrictentoernooi: 1
Winners: 1989

References

Coronie Boys